Akhmed Magomedovich Tsebiev was a Chechen physicist and inventor from Makhkety, Vedensky District, Chechen-Ingush ASSR. He had a PhD in technical sciences and was the author of 26 inventions in the field of radio electronics and radio communications confirmed by the Soviet State Committee for Inventions and Discoveries. Akhmed was also the author of more than 50 scientific works in open and closed press.

Biography 
Akhmed was born into the small village of Makhkety in the Chechen-Ingush ASSR. In 1959, he graduated from Rostov State University. Upon graduation, he moved to the city of Fryazino. In 1974, he defended his thesis for the degree of candidate of technical sciences.

In 1959, a group of employees of NPO Istok in the town of Fryazino, Moscow region, led by Tsebiev, made a discovery of a new phenomenon predicted a year earlier in an article by the American physicist D. Reed:

From 1966 to 1973, Akhmed was the scientific supervisor of two research projects and the chief designer of the preliminary project. During this period Tsebiev products that had been created had no analogues in the USSR and abroad. These works were accepted by the State Commissions with a high appraisal and recommended for practical implementation.

Tsebiev's works were included in the book "Discoveries of Soviet Scientists":

Later life 

In 1977, a group of employees was nominated for the Lenin Prize. Among the applicants was Tsebiev. All members of this group received the award with the exception of Tsebiev, despite his contribution being the most significant.

In 1983, he returned to Chechen-Ingush ASSR where he worked at the Grozny Oil Institute. In 1983, he started working at NPO Promavtomatika in Grozny. In 1987, the first computer classes were launched in Urus-Martan (school No. 5) and in Grozny (school No. 9). In school No. 9 of Grozny in 1988, Tsebiev combined computers into a wireless local area network.

In 2000, 65-year-old Akhmed was shot and killed by looters from the Russian army only because he refused to hand them his computer.

Memory 
His name was given to secondary school No. 9 in Grozny, and the wireless computer network he created 1988 still operates.

References 

Chechen people
1935 births
2000 deaths